Mălădia may refer to:

 Mălădia [ro], a village in Măeriște Commune, Sălaj County, Romania
 Mălădia River, a tributary of Crasna River (Tisza) in Romania

See also 
 Mălăești (disambiguation)
 Mălăiești (disambiguation)